Khodadadi may refer to:
 Khodadadi, Fars
 Khodadadi, Hormozgan

See also
 Khodadad (disambiguation)